Flash Light is Tom Verlaine's fifth solo album. After a three-year hiatus, during which Verlaine lived in both New York and Europe, he released the album with a large amount of promotion and touring in the UK.

It was recorded by Mario Salvati at Sorcerer 2, New York City except "The Scientist Writes a Letter", engineered by Mark Wallis. Mixed by Paul O'Duffy at Sarm West, London.

The cover artwork was by Susan Hiller, who also created the cover artwork for the accompanying 7-inch singles, 'Cry Mercy Judge' and 'A Town Called Walker'. Layout by John Rimmer at Pointblanc.

Track listing
All songs written by Tom Verlaine

Side one
 "Cry Mercy Judge"
 "Say a Prayer"
 "A Town Called Walker"
 "Song"
 "The Scientist Writes a Letter"

Side two
 "Bomb"
 "4 A.M."
 "The Funniest Thing"
 "Annie's Telling Me"
 "One Time at Sundown"

Personnel
Tom Verlaine - guitar, vocals
Jimmy Ripp - guitar
Fred Smith - bass
Allan Schwartzberg - drums
Andy Newmark - drums on "The Scientist Writes a Letter"
Technical
Mark Wallis - engineer on "The Scientist Writes a Letter"
Paul O'Duffy - mixing
Mario Salvati - recording
Susan Hiller - cover artwork
John Rimmer - cover layout

Charts 
Album

Singles

References

http://www.thewonder.co.uk/flash.htm

1987 albums
Tom Verlaine albums
Fontana Records albums
I.R.S. Records albums